Juha Lauri Laukkanen (born 6 January 1969 in Pielavesi) is a retired male javelin thrower from Finland. His personal best throw is 88.22 metres, achieved in June 1992 in Kuortane. In the 1994 Bislett Games in Oslo his throw resulted in a judge being impaled in his arm by the javelin.

Seasonal bests by years
1987 - 79.46
1988 - 65.54
1992 - 88.22
1993 - 82.98
1994 - 81.66
1995 - 82.54
1996 - 87.12
1997 - 87.10
1998 - 86.96
1999 - 85.53
2000 - 82.35
2001 - 85.40
2002 - 78.93

Achievements

References

External links

sports-reference

1969 births
Living people
People from Pielavesi
Finnish male javelin throwers
Athletes (track and field) at the 1992 Summer Olympics
Olympic athletes of Finland
Sportspeople from North Savo